Lurgacullion is a townland in County Tyrone, Northern Ireland. It is situated in the historic barony of Dungannon Lower and the civil parish of Killeeshil and covers an area of 289 acres.

See also
List of townlands of County Tyrone

References

Townlands of County Tyrone
Civil parish of Killeeshil